Donald Sloan (31 July 1883 – 1 January 1917) was a Scottish professional footballer who played for in the Football League for Everton and Liverpool as a goalkeeper. He also played in the Scottish and Irish Leagues and made one appearance for the Irish League XI.

Personal life 
Sloan served as a private in the Black Watch during the First World War. He was killed when a German heavy mortar hit his dugout on 1 January 1917 near Saint-Laurent-Blangy, which caused it to collapse. He was buried in Faubourg-d'Amiens Cemetery, Arras. Sloan's elder brother Alexander Sloan later became the Labour MP for South Ayrshire. Four of his younger brothers also fought in the First World War, of whom three died.

Career statistics

References 

1883 births
Scottish footballers
Liverpool F.C. players
1917 deaths
Lisburn Distillery F.C. players
Everton F.C. players
British military personnel killed in World War I
Footballers from South Ayrshire
Association football goalkeepers
English Football League players
British Army personnel of World War I
Black Watch soldiers
Irish League representative players
NIFL Premiership players
NIFL Premiership managers
Scottish football managers
Ayr F.C. players
Bathgate F.C. players
East Stirlingshire F.C. players
Scottish Football League players
Lisburn Distillery F.C. managers